The 8th constituency of Yvelines is a French legislative constituency in the Yvelines département.

Description

The 8th constituency of Yvelines is located in the north of the department including the towns of Mantes-la-Jolie and Mantes-la-Ville south of the Seine and Limay on its northern bank. The two parts of the constituency are linked by two bridges across the Seine over the Île aux Dames. The three towns within the constituency form one urban area.

The constituency is one of only two in Yvelines held by the PS at the 2012 election. Historically it has always been something of a marginal seat swapping between right and left in line with the national trend.

Historic Representation

Election results

2022

 
 
 
 
 
 
 
|-
| colspan="8" bgcolor="#E9E9E9"|
|-

2017

 
 
 
 
 
 
 
 
 
|-
| colspan="8" bgcolor="#E9E9E9"|
|-

2012

 
 
 
 
 
|-
| colspan="8" bgcolor="#E9E9E9"|
|-

2007

 
 
 
 
 
 
 
|-
| colspan="8" bgcolor="#E9E9E9"|
|-

2002

 
 
 
 
|-
| colspan="8" bgcolor="#E9E9E9"|
|-

1997

 
 
 
 
 
 
|-
| colspan="8" bgcolor="#E9E9E9"|
|-

Sources
Official results of French elections from 2002: "Résultats électoraux officiels en France" (in French).

8